Carlisle School District is a public school district based in Carlisle, Arkansas, United States. The school district encompasses  of land in Lonoke County and Prairie County including all of the municipalities of Carlisle, Allport, and Humnoke.

The mascot and athletic emblem for the schools is the Bison with black and gold serving as the schools' colors.  The varsity and junior varsity teams compete in the 2A Region 6 Conference as administered by the Arkansas Activities Association. The district and its schools are accredited by the Arkansas Department of Education (ADE).

History

On July 1, 1998, the former Humnoke School District consolidated with the Carlisle School District.

In 2007, the district proposed a property tax increase because it believed that the increase could help it build a new high school. An Arkansas state law passed in 2005 had the potential of helping Carlisle School District pay for a new high school.

Schools 
 Carisle High School, serving more than 350 students in grades 7 through 12.
 Carisle Ełementary School, serving more than 450 students in prekindergarten through grade 6.

References

Further reading
Maps of Carlisle and Humnoke districts:
  (Download)
  (Download)

External links

 

Education in Lonoke County, Arkansas
Education in Prairie County, Arkansas
School districts in Arkansas